A signature weapon (or trademark weapon or weapon of choice) is one commonly identified with a certain group or, in the case of literature, epic poems, comics, and film, where it is a popular trope, for both heroes and villains to be associated with and highly proficient in the use of specific weaponry. Examples include Robin Hood's longbow, Don Quixote's jousting lance, a wizard's wand, the Grim Reaper's scythe, Zeus' thunderbolt, Poseidon's trident, Thor's hammer, Arjuna's bow, the Monkey King's iron rod, a Jedi's lightsaber, William Tell's crossbow, David's sling and James Bond's Walther PPK. The Colt .45 SAA and Winchester are ubiquitous in Westerns. In horror cinema, there is Jason Voorhees's machete, Freddy Krueger's bladed glove and Leatherface's chainsaw. 

Signature weapons enable viewers of limited animation superhero cartoons, comics, fantasy anime and mecha to easily distinguish between characters who are often nearly identical in appearance (e.g., the Teenage Mutant Ninja Turtles). Signature weapons are a common feature of role-playing games and video games, where their acquisition usually marks a newly heightened level of martial prowess and/or aids in the creation of a unique avatar.

Historical examples 
Non-fictional associations include samurai and their katana (which were restricted to the warrior class in feudal Japan), the U.S. General George S. Patton, who carried an ivory-gripped Colt Single Action Army into battle (and had two kills with it during the Mexican Expedition), the Nazi SS Luger, the Roman pilum, a knight-errant's battlefield regalia, the Thuggee garrote, and Prohibition-era gangster "Machine Gun Kelly", who cultivated his reputation for employing a Thompson automatic.

References

Weapons